Minnesotaite is an iron silicate mineral with formula: (Fe2+,Mg)3Si4O10(OH)2. It crystallizes in the triclinic crystal system and occurs as fine needles and platelets with other silicates.  It is isostructural with the pyrophyllite-talc mineral  group.

Occurrence
Minnesotaite was first described in 1944 for occurrences in the banded iron formations of northern Minnesota for which it was named. Co-type localities are in the Cuyuna North Range, Crow Wing County and the Mesabi Range in St. Louis County.

It occurs associated with quartz, siderite, stilpnomelane, greenalite and magnetite. In addition to the low grade metamorphic banded iron formations it has also been reported as an alteration mineral associated with sulfide bearing veins.

References

Phyllosilicates
Triclinic minerals
Minerals in space group 2